Sidorovskaya is a rural locality (a village) in Osinovskoye Rural Settlement, Vinogradovsky District, Arkhangelsk Oblast, Russia. The population was 15 as of 2010.

Geography 
Sidorovskaya is located on the Severnaya Dvina River, 37 km southeast of Bereznik (the district's administrative centre) by road. Filippovskaya is the nearest rural locality.

References 

Rural localities in Vinogradovsky District